The Central Bank of Suriname (CBvS) is Suriname’s highest monetary authority and the country’s governing body in monetary and economic affairs.

The Central Bank’s tasks were legislated in the Bank Act of 1956. Like other central banks, it is the principal monetary authority of the country. Other tasks include the promotion of the value and stability of the currency of Suriname, the provision of money circulation, the safeguarding of private banking and credit union activities, together with balanced socio-economic development.

The Central Bank is headed by a Governor and divided into three directorates: Banking Operations, Monetary and Economic Affairs and Supervision.

History
After the start of Suriname’s political self-government from the Netherlands in 1954, changes were instigated to the country’s monetary system; on 1 April 1957, the Central bank of Suriname was established in Paramaribo and took over the issuing of currency.

Until 1957, De Surinaamsche Bank (DSB), which at that time was a subsidiary of the Dutch Nederlandsche Handel-Maatschappij and the largest commercial bank in Suriname, acted as default issuer of currency.

Governors
Rudolf Groenman, April 1957 – October 1961
Victor Max de Miranda, July 1963 – December 1980
Jules Sedney, December 1980 – January 1983
Henk Goedschalk, January 1985 – January 1994
André Telting, March 1994 – December 1996
Henk Goedschalk, January 1997 – August 2000
André Telting, September 2000 – August 2010
Gillmore Hoefdraad, September 2010 – August 2015
Glenn Gersie, February 2016 – February 2019
Robert-Gray van Trikt, March 2019 – January 2020
Maurice Roemer, February 2020 – 
Source:

See also

 Surinamese dollar
 Economy of the Caribbean
 Economy of South America
 Economy of the Netherlands Antilles
 Netherlands Antillean gulden
 De Nederlandsche Bank
 Central Bank of Aruba
 Economy of Curaçao
 Dutch Caribbean Securities Exchange
 Central banks and currencies of the Caribbean

References

External links
 Official site: Central Bank of Suriname

Suriname
Banks of Suriname
1957 establishments in Suriname
Banks established in 1957
Companies of Suriname